The 2002 Wakefield Metropolitan District Council election took place on 2 May 2002 to elect members of Wakefield Metropolitan District Council in West Yorkshire, England. One third of the council was up for election and the Labour party kept overall control of the council.

After the election, the composition of the council was
Labour 53
Conservative 5
Independent 3
Liberal Democrat 2

Campaign
Before the election the council had 55 Labour, 4 Conservative, 3 Independent and 1 Liberal Democrat members. Each of the Labour and Conservative parties stood candidates in all 21 wards, along with 11 Liberal Democrats and 15 other candidates from various parties. Labour were defending 20 seats in the election, with two seats being contested in Pontefract South due to the resignation of a councillor, while the other 2 seats were held by independents. One of the 2 independents who was defending his seat in Wakefield South was Norman Hazell, a former leader of the Conservatives in Wakefield, who had defected from the party in 2001.

During the campaign an investigation was started by West Yorkshire Police after allegations of fraud in South Kirkby ward. Here over a quarter of the 900 postal vote applications had been found to be invalid.

Election result
The Labour party remained firmly in control of the council and were pleased with only losing 2 seats in the election. The Conservatives gained Wakefield Rural, while the Liberal Democrats took Ossett. Meanwhile, both independents held their seats, with Norman Hazell's defence of Wakefield South as an independent being seen as a surprise result. Overall turnout in the election was 23.5%.

Ward results

References

2002 English local elections
2002
2000s in West Yorkshire